Patrick John MacAllister Anderson (4 August 1915 – 17 March 1979) was an English-Canadian poet. He was educated at Oxford, where he was elected President of the Union, and Columbia. He taught in Montreal at Selwyn House School from 1940 to 1946 and at McGill University between 1948 and 1950. One of his students at both schools was Charles Taylor.

In March 1942 Anderson and Montreal Group poet F. R. Scott founded Montreal literary magazine Preview; A.M. Klein and P. K. Page also became part of the editorial group. According to The Canadian Encyclopedia, "Preview's orientation was cosmopolitan; its members looked largely towards the English poets of the 1930s for inspiration."

In 1943, critic John Sutherland published a review of Anderson's poetry in rival magazine First Statement which suggested homoerotic themes in his writing, and accusing Anderson of "some sexual experience of a kind not normal"; although Anderson would in fact come out as gay later in life, he was married at the time to Peggy Doernbach, and threatened to sue. Sutherland printed a retraction in the following issue. The incident was little known outside of Montreal at the time, as both magazines had small, primarily local circulations, although it would come to be more extensively analyzed in the 1990s as an important incident in the history of LGBT literature in Canada.

Anderson and Doernbach were members of the Labor-Progressive Party, and were active supporters of Labour-Progressive MP Fred Rose.

Preview merged with First Statement in 1945 to become Northern Review.

Following his divorce from Doernbach in 1950, Anderson left Canada, teaching for two years in Malaysia before returning to England. He subsequently entered into a same-sex relationship with Alistair Sutherland, with whom he co-edited Eros: An Anthology of Male Friendship in 1961; in this era, he also published memoirs and travel writing. Despite this, he continued to treat his sexuality as a private matter, declining inclusion in an anthology of gay male literature in 1972. He remained a resident of England for the rest of his life, although he sometimes returned to Canada in the 1970s as a guest lecturer; his final volume of poetry, published in 1977, was titled Return to Canada.

Selected bibliography
1943: Military Camp
1945: A Tent for April 
1946: The White Centre 
1953: The Colour as Naked 
1955: Snake Wine: A Singapore Episode 
1957: Search Me 
1961: Eros: An Anthology of Male Friendship 
1964: The Smile of Apollo: A Literary Companion to Greek Travel 
1969: Over the Alps: Reflections on Travel and Travel Writing 
1976: A Visiting Distance - Poems: New, Revised, And Selected 
1977: Return to Canada

See also

Canadian literature
Canadian poetry
List of Canadian poets
List of Canadian writers

References

1915 births
1979 deaths
20th-century Canadian poets
20th-century Canadian male writers
20th-century English memoirists
20th-century English male writers
20th-century English poets
20th-century English LGBT people
20th-century Canadian LGBT people
Canadian male poets
Canadian memoirists
Canadian travel writers
English travel writers
Writers from Montreal
Gay poets
Gay memoirists
Academic staff of McGill University
Canadian magazine editors
British emigrants to Canada
People from Ashtead
Canadian LGBT poets
English male poets
Presidents of the Oxford Union
Presidents of the Oxford University Conservative Association
Canadian male non-fiction writers
English male non-fiction writers
Gay academics
English LGBT poets
Canadian LGBT academics
Canadian gay writers